Hollingsworth Glacier is a broad glacier of low gradient, draining the vicinity east of the Ricker Hills and flowing northeast to enter David Glacier just east of the Trio Nunataks, in Victoria Land, Antarctica. It lies partly within the Ross Dependency. It was mapped by the United States Geological Survey from surveys and U.S. Navy air photos, 1956–62, and was named by the Advisory Committee on Antarctic Names for Jerry L. Hollingsworth, a meteorologist with the South Pole Station winter party in 1966.

References

Glaciers of Victoria Land